Nightmares Film Festival is a destination film festival for horror and genre films in Columbus, Ohio. It hosts celebrities, artists, filmmakers, screenwriters, industry reps and press from the horror genre.
It is frequently cited as one of the most influential genre film festivals in the USA and is recognized internationally.

History
Nightmares Film Festival was founded in 2016 by indie filmmaker Jason Tostevin and Chris Hamel, the president of the Gateway Film Center. Prior to that, Tostevin had frequently collaborated with Hamel and recalls:

[Chris Hamel]'s a film programmer and I'm a filmmaker with a lot of festival experience, and we're both just big fans. We have talked so many times about the movies we were seeing out there on the circuit, and how we wished there was one place that would gather them all together for the horror fans in Ohio. Finally, we decided to create that place, and Nightmares was formed.

The festival is held annually the weekend before Halloween at the Gateway Film Center and is a permanent fixture in the arts calendar of Columbus.

Awards
Nightmares Film Festival awards the following categories:
 The Film from Hell – best of the festival
 Best overall feature/short
 Best horror feature/short
 Best thriller feature/short
 Best midnight feature/short
 Best horror-comedy feature/short
 Best director feature/short
 Best cinematography feature/short
 Best writing feature/short
 Best lead performance feature/short
 Best supporting performance feature/short
 Best Recurring Nightmare
Best screenplay feature/short

References

External links 

Film festivals in Ohio
Fantasy and horror film festivals in the United States
Culture of Columbus, Ohio
Festivals established in 2016
Short film festivals in the United States